380 Melbourne (also known as 380 Lonsdale Street) is a residential and hotel skyscraper in Melbourne, Victoria, Australia. 

Designed by Elenberg Fraser and developed by Brady Group, the project includes 728 residential apartments as well as 312 hotel rooms within a 67-level skyscraper, and reaches a height of 217.5 metres (714 feet).

The Lonsdale Street development was first proposed in 2013, initially as a 47-storey tower; however, plans were later re–submitted and hence the project was redesigned. 380 Lonsdale Street received planning approval by the Minister for Planning Richard Wynne in March, 2015. The project had an estimated worth of AUD$240.5 million, and construction commenced in March 2018 and had an expected completion date set in 2020. The project was completed in 2021.

In 2018, IHG signed a deal with the Brady Group to have a voco-branded hotel open in the building.

References

External links 
 
380 Lonsdale Street — on Council on Tall Buildings & Urban Habitat Skyscraper Center

 

Skyscrapers in Melbourne
Residential skyscrapers in Australia
Apartment buildings in Melbourne
Skyscraper hotels in Australia
Buildings and structures completed in 2021
2021 establishments in Australia
Buildings and structures in Melbourne City Centre